Alive at Home is a live album by the Movement. It was recorded at Headliners Mainstage in Columbia, South Carolina and released in January 2006.

Track listing 
Habit – 4:33
Scream – 4:31
Scary – 5:45
Mexico – 4:25
On Your Feet – 3:39
Fu-Gee-La (The Fugees cover) – 2:54
Green Girl – 4:49
Roots, Rock, Reggae (Bob Marley cover) – 3:48
End of the Road – 5:16
Down Down – 4:20
Cold Outside – 3:39
Throwdown – 3:43
Hola – 4:27
I Know – 4:20
Livest Shit – 5:31
Purpose – 7:10

Personnel 
Jordan Miller – guitar, vocals, band member
Jon Ruff – turntables, band member
Josh Swain – bass guitar, guitar, vocals, band member

External links 
 www.themovementvibe.com The Movement's official website
 www.bandcamp.com Alive at Home album on Bandcamp

2006 live albums
The Movement (reggae band) albums